Elections to Watford Borough Council in England were held on 5 May 2011. Three years in every four, a third of the council (12 councillors) retires and elections are held (in the fourth year, elections are held for county councillors).

In this council election, the Labour Party gained two seats; the Liberal Democrats and the Conservative lost one each. The Liberal Democrats remained firmly in control of the council. Four parties, Liberal Democrats, Labour, Conservative and Green, all put up candidates in every seat. There were also three UKIP candidates and one independent.

After the election, the composition of the council was:
Liberal Democrat: 24
Labour: 6
Green: 3
Conservative: 3

Council election result

Ward results

References

2011 English local elections
2011
2010s in Hertfordshire